The Dongyin Power Plant is a diesel-fuel power plant in Dongyin Township, Lienchiang County, Taiwan.

History
The power plant was commissioned on 31 October 1971.

See also

 List of power stations in Taiwan
 Electricity sector in Taiwan

References

1971 establishments in Taiwan
Buildings and structures in Lienchiang County
Dongyin Township
Energy infrastructure completed in 1971
Oil-fired power stations in Taiwan